James Edmound Shea Jr. (born June 10, 1968) is an American skeleton racer who won the gold medal at the 2002 Winter Olympics in Salt Lake City. Shea also was chosen by fellow athletes to recite the Athlete's Oath during the Opening Ceremonies. Along with his father, Jim Shea Sr., he passed the Olympic Torch to Cammi Granato and Picabo Street who then passed it to the 1980 U.S. Men's Hockey Team, who then ignited the Olympic Cauldron. Shortly before the Olympics he was a guest of Laura Bush in the First Lady's Box at the 2002 State of the Union Address.

Biography
Shea was the third generation of his family to take part in Winter Games. His father competed in Nordic combined and cross-country skiing events in the 1964 Winter Olympics, and his grandfather, Jack Shea, won two gold medals in the 1932 Winter Olympics at Lake Placid in speed skating. His grandfather also recited the athlete's oath at the 1932 opening ceremony.
He was born and raised in West Hartford, Connecticut, and moved to Lake Placid, New York, in his late teens. He became the first American to win a World Cup race and a World Championship in the sport, and has won more World Cup victories than any other American. He retired in October 2005.

At the FIBT World Championships, Shea earned a complete set of medals in the men's skeleton event with a gold in 1999, a silver in 1997, and a bronze in 2000 (tied for bronze with Austria's Alexander Müller). His best overall seasonal finish in the men's Skeleton World Cup was third twice (1998–99, 2000–01).  Shea's efforts and World Championship status assisted in the reintroduction of skeleton as a medal sport.

Shea has since founded The Shea Family Foundation which raises money to help kids in sports. He currently serves on the Utah Board of Economic Development.

Shea has two daughters and a son and lives in Park City, Utah.

See also
List of Olympic medalist families

References

External links
 
 CBS Sports profile
 FIBT profile
 IOC 2002 Winter Olympics
 List of men's skeleton World Cup champions since 1987
 Men's skeleton Olympic medalists since 1928
 Men's skeleton world championship medalists since 1989
 Olympian Shea talk raises eyebrows
 Shea's official 2002 Olympic website
 U.S. Olympic Committee profile

1968 births
Living people
Sportspeople from Hartford County, Connecticut
American male skeleton racers
Olympic gold medalists for the United States in skeleton
Olympic skeleton racers of the United States
Skeleton racers at the 2002 Winter Olympics
Medalists at the 2002 Winter Olympics
People from Park City, Utah
People from West Hartford, Connecticut
Oath takers at the Olympic Games